Kenneth Brown is a playwright, actor, director and producer (born 20 January 1954) who has been active in theatre since 1971.   He is an author or co-author of the following plays:
 Bombs!
 Letters in Wartime
 Life After Hockey (1985)  (There is also a film version)
 My Father's House
 Nightlight
 North of America (There is a German radio play version of this, called Nach Manitoba which was translated by Werner Richter for Westdeutscher Rundfunk and went on air for the first time in 1993)
 Sparks
 The Adventures of Joseph Andrews (1998) 
 The Bridge
 2 Balance (2000)
 Be A Man (with Ribbit Productions, 2001)
 Lewis Lapham Live
 Spiral Dive Trilogy (2008)
 Cowboy Gothic (2011)
 The Gambling Show (with Ribbit Productions, 2010)

References

External links
 Playwrights Guild entry
 playdatabase.com entry
 doolee.com playwrights database

1954 births
20th-century Canadian dramatists and playwrights
21st-century Canadian dramatists and playwrights
Living people
Canadian male dramatists and playwrights
20th-century Canadian male writers
21st-century Canadian male writers